Harry Eugene Wood (May 31, 1926 – November 23, 2009) was a judge of the United States Court of Claims from 1969 to 1982, and on the United States Court of Federal Claims from 1982 to 1986.

Early life, education, and career

Born in Spartanburg, South Carolina, Wood served in the United States Army during World War II, from 1944 to 1946. He received an A.A. from George Washington University in 1949, and a J.D. from the George Washington University Law School in 1952, where he was a member of the Order of the Coif and the Delta Theta Phi legal fraternity. He then served as a law clerk for the United States Court of Claims from 1952 to 1954, before entering private practice in Washington, D.C., from 1954 to 1969. From 1959 to 1986, he was also a United States Army Reserve member of the JAG Corps, achieving the rank of colonel.

Federal judicial service

In 1969, Wood became a Trial judge of the United States Court of Claims. On October 1, 1982, he was reassigned by operation of law to the newly formed United States Claims Court (which later became the United States Court of Federal Claims). He assumed senior status on April 20, 1986, and resigned from the court entirely on July 31, 1986.

Personal life

Wood married Katherine Terrell on August 23, 1947.

References

External links 

1926 births
2009 deaths
George Washington University alumni
George Washington University Law School alumni
Judges of the United States Court of Federal Claims
United States Article I federal judges appointed by Richard Nixon
20th-century American judges
United States Army personnel of World War II
United States Army colonels
United States Army reservists
United States Army Judge Advocate General's Corps